Bethany Convent Senior Secondary School is a private school situated on the banks of river Ganga (Ganges) at Prayagraj in Uttar Pradesh, India. It teaches students from kindergarten to Intermediate. It is one of the senior secondary schools in Allahabad with education provided by a convent-run organization, The Sisters of the Little Flower of Bethany, Mangalore.

Establishment and Administration 
The school was established in 1965 under the patronage of Msgr. Raymond Francis Camillus Mascarenhas, the founder of the Congregation of the sisters of the Little Flowers of the Bethany.

In 1965, at the request of the people, Rev. Raymond D’Mello, the Bishop of Allahabad, requested aid from Mother Macrina to start an educational Institution in Naini. She sent five sisters to Allahabad for such establishment, Sr Rosine. Sr Noeline, Sr Maria Rosé, Sr Geraldine and Sr Eunice. The land was acquired under the collective efforts of Fr Faustin Alva and by the former Bishop Dr Leonard Raymond. Raymond D’Mello entrusted the construction of the school to Fr Paul Menezes. On 12th July 1965, the School was started with 60 students from classes kindergarten to grade three with Sr Rosine as the first principal. The school acquired C.B.S.E.'s affiliation on 25 November 1975. The school acquired the status of Senior Secondary on 2 April 2008 under the collective efforts of Sr Helima, the then Principal, and Sr Lyra, the then superior.

The school, at present, is administrated by Bethany Educational Society, Mangalore, Karnataka, a non governmental organization registered under the Societies' Registration Act XXI of 1860 No.17 of 1948-49.

References

Christian schools in Uttar Pradesh
Primary schools in Uttar Pradesh
High schools and secondary schools in Uttar Pradesh
Schools in Allahabad
Educational institutions established in 1965
1965 establishments in Uttar Pradesh